James Whitehouse (19 September 1934 – 26 May 2022) was an English professional footballer who played as an inside forward for West Bromwich Albion, Reading, Coventry City, Millwall, Hillingdon Borough, Hastings United and Andover.

References

1934 births
2022 deaths
Sportspeople from West Bromwich
English footballers
Association football inside forwards
English Football League players
West Bromwich Albion F.C. players
Reading F.C. players
Coventry City F.C. players
Millwall F.C. players
Hillingdon Borough F.C. players
Hastings United F.C. players
Andover F.C. players